New Frankfort may refer to:

New Frankfort, Indiana
New Frankfort, Missouri

See also
New Frankfurt